Gaifan or gaijiaofan is a type of dish in Chinese cuisine typically offered in low-cost establishments. It consists of a fish, meat, or vegetable topping served over rice. The dish can be either freshly cooked or previously cooked, such as char siu. According to the Commentary to the Classic of Rites, gaifan can be dated back to Western Zhou.  Throughout the Tang Dynasty, gaifan was served during the banquets of newly promoted officials.

See also
Donburi, usually called "Japanese gaifan" in China.

References

Chinese rice dishes